Baby Helen (known by her stage name Shuchorita; born 1958) is a Bangladeshi film actress.  She won the Bangladesh National Film Award for Best Actress for her role in the film Hangor Nodi Grenade (1997) and Best Supporting Actress for Meghkonna (2018). She has acted in over 100 movies.

Background
Shuchorita was born in Dhaka, a middle child of the three siblings. Her older sister, Rita, was the one who opened up the path to film industry but after a few films she decided to settle down and work on her married life while Shuchorita hit the spotlight. Their younger brother, Manu, died in a fire accident at his home around Eid ul Fitr in 1998.

Career
Shuchorita got into the film industry through the help of her aunt, Panna, a dance artist herself. Shuchorita started her acting career as a child artist, playing the role of a boy, in the 1969 film Bablu. She was cast as the lead actress in the film Shikriti in 1972.

As an actress, she got her breakthrough in the film Jadur Bashi (1977).

Works

Personal life
In the early 1980s, Shuchorita was married to actor Jashim for a year. In 1989, she married film producer, KMR Manzoor, and they have three children together. The couple got divorced in December 2012.

Awards
Beside the Bangladesh National Film Award, Shuchorita won Best Actress award from Bangladesh Film Journalists Association in 1981.

References

External links

 

Living people
1958 births
Bangladeshi film actresses
Best Actress National Film Awards (Bangladesh) winners
People from Dhaka
Date of birth missing (living people)
Best Actress Bachsas Award winners
Best Supporting Actress National Film Award (Bangladesh) winners